Queen of Drags is a German drag competition television series, featuring 10 talented drag queens from Germany, Austria and Switzerland, series began airing on November 14, 2019.

Ten drag queens moved to a luxurious villa, lived together for several weeks, and were given a new task by Heidi Klum, Bill Kaulitz, and Conchita Wurst each week, from implementing the weekly motto perfectly to performing the best on stage and delighting the studio audience in Los Angeles. After every performance, the three main judges and the guest judge will each assign points. The queen with the most points earns the title of "Queen of the Week", while the queen with the least points has to leave the competition.

In a live event, the show was announced on June 27, 2019 by ProSieben, a German TV channel; that a kind of Drag Race TV format will start to premiere in winter of the same year.

Series overview

Season 1 (2019)

Contestants
(Ages and names stated are at time of contest)

Contestant progress 

   The contestant won Queen of Drags.
  The contestant was the runner-up.
  The contestant was third.
  The contestant received the highest score that week, and earned the title of Queen of the Week.
  The contestant received one of the top 3 scores that week, but did not win the title of Queen of the Week.
  The contestant received one of the bottom 3 scores that week.
  The contestant received the second lowest score that week.
  The contestant received the lowest score that week, and was eliminated.
  The contestant was eliminated in a challenge before the weekly live performances.

Episodes

Episode 1: "The Art of Drag" 
The ten queens move into the villa and get to know the judges. They prepare for the first live show in front of an audience, the three main judges and the guest judge Olivia Jones. The objective of that live show is to display their personal drag style.

 Guest Judge: Olivia Jones
 Show theme: Show your personal drag style.
 
 

Performances

Scoreboard

Episode 2: "Future Universe" 
Conchita visits the remaining 9 queens in their villa to announce this week's theme: "Future Universe". They have two hours to turn garbage into an outfit which they will present on the runway after their lip-sync performances in front of the judges and a live audience. Both of these performances are meant to fit this week's futuristic/science-fiction theme.

 Guest Judge: Amanda Lepore
 Show theme: Future Universe (and present a look created with unconventional materials)
 Runway song: "Boys" by Lizzo
 

Performances

Scoreboard

Episode 3: "Fairytale"
The remaining 8 queens are visited by the mailman in their villa who sends this week's theme: "Fairytale". The four lowest queens from the week prior have to act in a parody of the fairytale "Little Red Riding Hood", while the top four queens will act as judges alongside Heidi, Bill and Conchita who will eliminate the weakest link. Afterwards, the remaining 7 queens will present their lip-sync performances to this week's theme in front of the judges and a live audience.

 Guest Judge: Leona Lewis
 Show theme: Fairytale
 Play: "Rot-Dragchen und der böse Wolf" starring Catherrine Leclery (as the grandmother), Candy Crash (as the Big Bad Wolf), Hayden Kryze (as "Rot-Dragchen") and Vava Vilde (as the hunter/narrator)
 
 

Performances

Scoreboard

Episode 4: "Divas & Icons"
The remaining 6 queens are yet again visited by the mailman with this week's motto: "Divas and Icons". The queens are separated into two groups (according to their placements from the week prior) and have to choreograph a group number as well as individual solo numbers to perform after their lip-sync performances to this week's theme in front of the judges and a live audience.

 Guest Judge: Pabllo Vittar
 Show theme: Divas & Icons

Performances

Group Number: Battle of the Divas

Scoreboard

Episode 5: "Horror & Halloween"
The remaining 5 queens are visited by the mailman with this week's motto: "Horror and Halloween". In addition to their regular horror performance, the queens have to perform a dance number with a dance partner to songs chosen by the judges. Both performances take place in front of the judges and a live audience.

 Guest Judge: La Toya Jackson
 Show theme: Horror & Halloween

Performances

Scoreboard

Episode 6: "The Grand Finale"
The final 3 queens are visited by their fellow queens with the final motto: "Candyland". In addition to their regular performance, the finalists need to perform with the already eliminated queens in small groups and as one large group to songs chosen by the judges. Their three performances take place in front of the judges and a live audience.

 Guest Judge: Laganja Estranja
 Show theme: Candyland
 Top Three: Aria Addams, Vava Vilde and Yoncé Banks

Group Numbers

Performances

Scoreboard

References

External links

 Queen of Drags at IMDb

Drag (clothing) television shows
German reality television series
2019 German television series debuts
German LGBT-related television shows
2010s LGBT-related reality television series